"My Best Friend" is a song written by Aimee Mayo and Bill Luther and recorded by American country music singer Tim McGraw.  It was released in October 1999 as the third single from McGraw's album A Place in the Sun. The song reached number one the US Billboard Hot Country Singles & Tracks chart.

Critical reception
Ben Foster of Country Universe gave the song a B+ grade, and wrote that "Sometimes it just takes the right vocalist to find the layers of emotion woven into a lyric that could scan as pedestrian in the hands of another performer. In this instance, Tim McGraw indeed proves to be the right vocalist." He also says that McGraw's "heartfelt performance is bolstered by a pleasant lilting melody and a laid-back arrangement featuring generous amounts of fiddle and steel guitar."

Chart positions
"My Best Friend" re-entered the U.S. Billboard Hot Country Singles & Tracks as an official single at number 75 for the week of October 9, 1999.

Weekly charts

Year-end charts

Certifications

References

1999 singles
Tim McGraw songs
Songs written by Aimee Mayo
Song recordings produced by Byron Gallimore
Song recordings produced by Tim McGraw
Song recordings produced by James Stroud
Curb Records singles
Country ballads
1999 songs
Songs written by Bill Luther (songwriter)